Kathal Burir Bagan is a Bangladeshi children's film released in 1988. It stars Tareen Jahan in the lead role and Subarna Mustafa and Humayun Faridi in supporting roles. It's the debut film of Tareen. It is directed by Badal Rahman.

Cast
 Suborna Mustafa
 Tareen Jahan
 Humayun Faridi
 Dilara Zaman

Music

References

External links

1988 films
1980s Bengali-language films
Bangladeshi children’s films
Bengali-language Bangladeshi films
Films directed by Badal Rahman
Films scored by Alauddin Ali